3674 Erbisbühl is an stony asteroid and one of the largest Mars-crossers from the innermost regions of the asteroid belt, approximately  in diameter. It was discovered on 13 September 1963, by German astronomer Cuno Hoffmeister at his Sonneberg Observatory on Mount Erbisbühl in Eastern Germany.

Orbit and classification 

Erbisbühl orbits the Sun in the inner main-belt at a distance of 1.5–3.2 AU once every 3 years and 7 months (1,324 days). Its orbit has an eccentricity of 0.38 and an inclination of 21° with respect to the ecliptic. The body's observation arc starts in 1963, as no precoveries were taken and no identifications were made prior to its official discovery.

Naming 

This minor planet was named for Mount Erbisbühl on which the discovering Sonneberg Observatory is located (also see 1039 Sonneberga). Cuno Hoffmeister, discoverer of this asteroid and founder of the observatory, lived and worked at Erbisbühl for many decades. The official naming citation was published by the Minor Planet Center on 2 February 1988.

Physical characteristics 

In the SMASS taxonomic scheme, Erbisbühl is a stony S-type asteroid, characterized as a Sk-subtype, a transitional form to the uncommon K-type asteroid.

Lightcurve 

A rotational lightcurve for this asteroid was obtained from photometric observations made at the U.S. Antelope Hills Observatory in December 2003. It rendered a rotation period of  hours with a brightness variation of 0.40 in magnitude.

Diameter and albedo 

According to the survey carried out by the Japanese Akari satellite, Erbisbühl has a high albedo of 0.25 with a corresponding diameter of 10.3 kilometers, while the NEOWISE mission gives a diameter of 9.1 kilometers and an albedo of 0.31. TheCollaborative Asteroid Lightcurve Link assumes a standard albedo for stony asteroids of 0.20 and calculates a diameter of 11.8 kilometers.

Notes

References

External links 
 Lightcurve Database Query (LCDB), at www.minorplanet.info
 Dictionary of Minor Planet Names, Google books
 Asteroids and comets rotation curves, CdR – Geneva Observatory, Raoul Behrend
 Discovery Circumstances: Numbered Minor Planets (1)-(5000) – Minor Planet Center
 
 

003674
Discoveries by Cuno Hoffmeister
Named minor planets
003674
19630913